State Highway 36 (SH 36) is a New Zealand state highway in the Bay of Plenty region in the North Island. It is one of two state highways (along with ) that form a north–south connection between the cities of Tauranga and Rotorua, SH 36 being the most westerly of the two. It was identified as a quicker route to access the two cities and extensive work was done to upgrade the rural route to state highway quality.

SH 36 is one of two state highways (the other being ) to be gazetted initially in one location, revoked, then gazetted again in another location. SH 36 used to be located in the Gisborne/Hawkes Bay district, some 200 km south east of where it is now, before being revoked in 1991. SH 36 at its current location became a state highway in 2005.

Route description
SH 36 travels south-east initially before merging with Pyes Pa Road at another roundabout intersection.

Route changes
Since being gazetted in 2005, SH 36 has had only one route change. This being at its northern terminus where SH 36 originally travelled up Pyes Pa Road and terminated at the roundabout with Cameron Road in the suburb of Greerton. It recently was shifted west to its current terminus, with the deviation along a newly constructed section of highway.

Former route
It was revoked in 1991.

Major intersections

See also
 List of New Zealand state highways

References

External links
 New Zealand Transport Agency

36
Transport in the Bay of Plenty Region